Alakurtti is a rural locality (a selo) in Kandalakshsky District of Murmansk Oblast, Russia, located north of the Arctic Circle at an altitude of  above sea level. Its population at the 2010 Census was 3,424. Before 1953 it was part of Finland and Karelo-Finnish Soviet Socialist Republic.

References

Notes

Sources

Rural localities in Murmansk Oblast
Kandalakshsky District